We TV (stylized as WE tv) is an American pay television channel. Owned by AMC Networks since its September 1997 launch, it is oriented mainly towards lifestyle and entertainment programming.

As of February 2015, approximately 85.2 million American households (73.2% of households with television) received We TV. In March 2015, AMC announced it would soon begin making its channels available to cord cutters, including AMC, BBC America, IFC, Sundance TV, and We TV itself.

History

Romance Classics (1997–2001)
We TV was originally known as Romance Classics when it launched on September 1, 1997 under the ownership of what was then the Cablevision Systems Corporation-controlled Rainbow Media. It was originally a movie channel focusing mostly on romantic dramas and comedies, and television miniseries; similar to the original format of AMC (as American Movie Classics), the channel initially broadcast its films commercial-free. At launch, the Rainbow-owned MuchMusic USA dropped movies as a stunt as a movie channel.

Format change as We TV (2001–2014)
This format was abandoned on January 1, 2001, when the channel was relaunched as WE: Women's Entertainment, taking on an ad-supported general entertainment format. In 2006, the channel was renamed WE tv. The channel aired the first three seasons of the popular Logie Award-winning Australian television series McLeod's Daughters, but dropped the show in April 2006. The channel's format then shifted towards reality shows, with several having topics related to weddings (such as Bridezillas, Big Easy Brides and My Fair Wedding with David Tutera). Other popular shows on the included Secret Lives of Women, The Locator and Amazing Cakes. In 2007, Rainbow would, however the channel's space, would launch a sister channel to WE tv. In 2009,  Rainbow launched Wedding Central, a sister channel to WE tv.  The channel closed on July 1, 2011.

In January 2011, We TV confirmed that it had signed Toni Braxton for a reality series, entitled Braxton Family Values, which is marketed as one of the flagship shows. To prepare for a new show lineup, We TV also gave the AMC a new logo and marketing tagline: "Life As WE Know It". In March 2012, We TV confirmed that the AMC had ordered 14 episodes of Kendra on Top, a reality show following the lives of Kendra Wilkinson and Hank Baskett, who previously appeared in the E! reality series Kendra. Kendra said the show focuses on "motherhood, parenthood, and wife hood". Kendra On Top premiered on June 5, 2012.

Rebranding (2014–present)
In June 2014, the AMC unveiled a new logo, dropping the "Women's Entertainment" tagline. AMC president Marc Juris explained that while the AMC was to remain "a leading destination for women on television and online", the goal of the new branding was to broaden the focus on the word "we" as representing shared experiences, describing it as "a powerful and universal theme which drives connection, conversation, collaboration and community". As part of the rebranding, AMC also announced its first original scripted series, The Divide, which was originally pitched for sister AMC, and was canceled after its first season. Its second series, South of Hell, was ordered, but burned off in one day on 2015's Black Friday after a change in the network's management back towards exclusively original reality programming.

Current programming

Unscripted
Bridezillas
Bridezillas: Scared Fit
Extreme Love
Growing Up Hip Hop
Love After Lockup
Love After Lockup: Life After Lockup
Mama June: From Not to Hot
Marriage Boot Camp: Reality Stars
Marriage Boot Camp: Reality Stars Family Edition
The TS Madison Experience (March 4, 2021)
Untold Stories of Hip Hop
Waka & Tammy: What The Flocka

Acquired unscripted
Beyond the Pole (2021)
Joseline's Cabaret (2021)
The Real Blac Chyna (2021)

Acquired scripted
Bones
Criminal Minds
CSI: Miami
Law & Order 
Law & Order: Criminal Intent
Monk
NCIS
Double Cross

Former programming

Scripted 
 The Divide
 South of Hell

Unscripted 

 Braxton Family Vaules
 A Stand Up Mother
 Adoption Diaries
 Adventures in Doggie Day Care
 Alien Abduction:True Confessions
 Amazing Wedding Cakes
 America's Cutest Puppies
 American Princess
 Amsale Girls
 Big Easy Brides
 Bride vs. Bride
 Bulging Brides
 Cheerleader U
 Cinematherapy
 Crimes of Passion
 The Cupcake Girls
 Cutting It: In the ATL
 Cyndi Lauper: Still So Unusual
 David Tutera's CELEBrations
 Designer to the Stars: Kari Whitman
 Dirty Dancing
 Downsized
 Dr. Miami
 Driven to Love
 Ex Isle 
 Extreme Ghost Stories
 Family Restaurant
 Fix My Family
 Ghosts In The Hood
 Girl Meets Cowboy
 Girl Meets Gown
Growing Up Hip Hop: Atlanta
Growing Up Hip Hop: New York
 Hair Trauma
 High School Confidential
 House of Curves
 Hustle & Soul
 I Want to Save Your Life
 Jilted?
 Jim & Chrissy: Vow or Never
 Joan & Melissa: Joan Knows Best?
 John Edward Cross Country
 Kendra on Top
 Kiss & Tell
 L.A. Hair 
 Little Miss Perfect
 The Locator
 Love Thy Sister
 The Lylas
 Mary Mary
 Match Made In Heaven
 Money. Power. Respect.
 Most Popular
 My Life is a Telenovela
 Mystery Millionaire
 Obsessed with the Dress
 Party Mama's
 Platinum Babies
 Platinum Weddings
 Pregnant & Dating
 Raising Sextuplets
 Rescue Mediums
 Rich Bride Poor Bride
 Secret Lives of Women
 Sanya's Glam & Gold
 Selling It: In the ATL
 Sex Box
 Sex Change Hospital
 Shannen Says
 She House
 She's Moving In
 Sinbad: It's Just Family
 Sisters in Law
 Skating's Next Star
 Spend It Fast!
 Split Ends
 Staten Island Cakes
 Style Me with Rachel Hunter
 Sunset Daze 
 SWV Reunited
 Tamar & Vince
 Tamar Braxton: Get Ya Life!
 Texas Multi Mamas
 Twister Sisters
 Ugliest House on The Block
 Unforgivable Crimes
 WE Investigates
 Wedding Central
 Wife, Mom, Bounty Hunter
 Women Behind Bars
 You're Wearing That?!?

 Acquired 

 20/20 48 Hours Blue Planet II Boston Public Charmed Committed Dharma & Greg Felicity Frasier Ghost Whisperer Girlfriends The Golden Girls The Great Christmas Light Fight Hope & Faith House How to Get Away with Murder Kate & Allie Madam Secretary McLeod's Daughters The Naked Truth Ned and Stacey Orphan Black Roseanne Two Guys and a Girl Will & Grace''

References

External links

AMC Networks
Television channels and stations established in 1997
English-language television stations in the United States
Women's interest channels